The FMRIB Software Library, abbreviated FSL, is a software library containing image analysis and statistical tools for functional, structural and diffusion MRI brain imaging data.

FSL is available as both precompiled binaries and source code for Apple and PC (Linux) computers. It is freely available for non-commercial use.

FSL Functionality

History and development
FSL is written mainly by members of the FMRIB (Functional Magnetic Resonance Imaging of the Brain) Analysis Group, Oxford
University, UK. The first release of FSL was in 2000; there has been
approximately one major new release each year to date. The FMRIB
Analysis Group is primarily funded by the Wellcome Trust and the UK EPSRC and
MRC Research Councils.

See also
 AFNI
 FreeSurfer
 SPM
 Neuroimaging

External links
 FSL website
 FMRIB Analysis Group

References

Computing in medical imaging
Engineering and Physical Sciences Research Council
Information technology organisations based in the United Kingdom
Neuroimaging
Neuroimaging software
Organisations associated with the University of Oxford
Wellcome Trust
Organizations established in 2012
2012 establishments in the United Kingdom